A lollipop is a type of sugar candy usually consisting of hard candy mounted on a stick and intended for sucking or licking. Different informal terms are used in different places, including lolly, sucker, sticky-pop, etc. Lollipops are available in many flavors and shapes.

Types 

Lollipops are available in a number of colors and flavors, particularly fruit flavors. With numerous companies producing lollipops, they now come in dozens of flavors and many different shapes. Lollipops can range from very small candies bought in bulk and given away as a courtesy at banks, barbershops, and other locations, to very large treats made from candy canes twisted into a spiral shape.

Most lollipops are eaten at room temperature, but "ice lollipops", "ice lollies", or "popsicles" are frozen water-based lollipops. Similar confections on a stick made of ice cream, often with a flavored coating, are usually not called by this name.

Some lollipops contain fillings, such as bubble gum or soft candy. Some novelty lollipops have more unusual items, such as mealworm larvae, embedded in the candy.
Other novelty lollipops have non-edible centers, such as a flashing light embedded within the candy; there is also a trend, principally in North America, of lollipops with sticks attached to a motorized device that makes the candy spin around in one's mouth.

In the Nordic countries, Germany, and the Netherlands, some lollipops are flavored with salmiak.

Medicinal use 
Lollipops can be used to carry medicines.

Some lollipops have been marketed for use as diet aids, although their effectiveness is untested, and anecdotal cases of weight loss may be due to the power of suggestion. Flavored lollipops containing medicine are intended to give children medicine without fuss.

Actiq is a powerful analgesic lollipop whose active ingredient is fentanyl. Often, patients utilizing large amounts of opioid pain medication take Actiq lozenges on a handle in order to control breakthrough cancer pain.

History 

The idea of an edible candy on a stick is very simple, and it is probable that the lollipop has been invented and reinvented numerous times. The first confectioneries that closely resemble what we call lollipops date to the Middle Ages, when the nobility would often eat boiled sugar with the aid of sticks or handles.

The invention of the modern lollipop is still something of a mystery but a number of American companies in the early 20th century have laid claim to it. According to the book Food for Thought: Extraordinary Little Chronicles of the World, they were invented by George Smith of New Haven, Connecticut, who started making large hard candies mounted on sticks in 1908. He named them after a racehorse of the time, Lolly Pop - and trademarked the lollipop name in 1931.

The term 'lollipop' was recorded by English lexicographer Francis Grose in 1796. The term may have derived from the term "lolly" (tongue) and "pop" (slap). The first references to the lollipop in its modern context date to the 1920s. Alternatively, it may be a word of Romany origin, being related to the Roma tradition of selling candy apples on a stick.

Ingredients 
The main ingredient in a standard lollipop is sugar. Sugars are fully hydrated carbon chains, meaning that there is a water molecule attached to each carbon. Sugars come in two forms; straight-chain and ring form. When sugars are in straight-chain form, aldehyde and ketone groups are open, which leaves them very susceptible to reaction. In this state, sugars are unstable. In ring form, sugars are stable and therefore exist in this form in most foods, including lollipops.

Sugar is a very versatile ingredient and is used in a wide variety of food products. Sugar interacts differently depending on the presence of other ingredients and on various treatments. When heated enough to break the molecules apart, sugar generates a complex flavor, changes the color, and creates a pleasing aroma. Sugar can form two types of solids in foods; crystalline and glassy amorphous. Crystalline solids can be found in food products such as fondant, fudge, and butter creams, while glassy amorphous solids can be found in products such as lollipops, marshmallows, and caramels. Glassy amorphous solids result when moderate sugar concentrations (50% solutions) are heated to high temperatures, eliminating nearly all moisture. The final moisture content is around 1%-2%, whereas the final moisture content in crystalline candies is 8%-12%. The non-crystalline nature of glassy amorphous solids is due to the presence of inhibitors in the solution. Without an inhibitor, crystallization would occur spontaneously and rapidly as sugar cools due to its high concentration. Some common inhibitors used in lollipop production are corn syrup, cream of tartar, honey, and butter.

The second most important ingredient in lollipop production is water. Although the moisture content falls to less than 2% at the end of the lollipop making process, water is required at the start of the process. All other ingredients used in the process of lollipop production are optional. The use of inhibitors is dependent on the type of sugar used. The amount of inhibitor in the lollipop is usually small in comparison to the amount of sugar used. Additional flavors, colorings, and inclusions (like bubble gum or a Tootsie Roll) can be added to the final product, but are not a part of the main structure of a simple lollipop.

Manufacturing 
While the main functional ingredients of a lollipop are quite simple, the process of making such confections can be complex. The formation and physical state of the glassy amorphous structure used in the creation of the lollipop is an involved chemical process. The first step in making lollipops after mixing the main ingredients is the heating process. During heating, the molecules increase in their translational mobility and therefore begin to resemble liquids. After heating is complete, the solution can then be cooled. The final cooled solution is a supersaturated due to the moisture content dropping below 2%. Supersaturated or supercooled liquids are also formed due to inhibitors preventing crystallization. They are unstable because crystallization is a favored reaction in this case. During the cooling process, the most important physicochemical characteristic of lollipops, the glass transition process, occurs.

See also 

 Chupa Chups
 Clear toy candy
 Dum Dums
 Hard candy
 Pirulín
 Stick candy
 Tootsie Pops
 Whistle Pops

References 

 
Brands that became generic
Candy